Ragazza alla pari (internationally released as The Best and Au-Pair Girl) is a 1976 commedia sexy all'italiana directed by Mino Guerrini.

Plot 
Domenica, a farmer girl from Val Brembana, becomes the au pair girl of the Chiocchietti family in Rome.

Cast 
 Gloria Guida as Domenica Schlutzer 
 Oreste Lionello as Mr. Chiocchetti
 Rossella Como as Miss Chiocchetti
 Patrizia Webley
 Carlo Giuffré
 Dada Gallotti

See also 
 List of Italian films of 1976

References

External links

1976 films
Commedia sexy all'italiana
Films directed by Mino Guerrini
1970s sex comedy films
1976 comedy films
1970s Italian films